Fort Green Mill is a tower mill at Aldeburgh, Suffolk, England which has been converted to residential accommodation.

History

Fort Green Mill was built in 1824. It was converted into a house in 1902.  During the Second World War it was used as a gun emplacement. 

It was put up for sale in 2016.

Description

Fort Green Mill is a four-storey tower mill. It had four patent sails and the domed cap was winded by a fantail. It had two pairs of millstones. A photograph of the working mill (above) shows that the sails were double patents carried on a cast-iron windshaft and the fantail had six blades.

There is an inscription in Danish, formerly above one of the doors, now on a wall, "Herren skal bevare din udgang og din indgang".  It means "The Lord shall preserve thy going out and thy coming in," from Psalm 121 verse 8.

References

External links
Windmill World webpage on Fort Green Mill.

Windmills in Suffolk
Tower mills in the United Kingdom
Windmills completed in 1824
Grinding mills in the United Kingdom
Suffolk Coastal
Buildings and structures in Suffolk
Aldeburgh